Henry Klumpenhouwer is a Canadian musicologist and former professor at the University of Alberta. He currently teaches at the Eastman School of Music. A former PhD student of David Lewin and the inventor of Klumpenhouwer networks, which are named after him, he is the former editor of Music Theory Spectrum.

See also
Transformational theory

Bibliography
Klumpenhouwer, Henry (1991). "Aspects of Row Structure and Harmony in Martino's Impromptu Number 6", p. 318n1, Perspectives of New Music, Vol. 29, No. 2 (Summer), pp. 318–354.
Klumpenhouwer, Henry (1992). "The Cartesian Choir", Music Theory Spectrum.

External links
"Our People - Theory - Music", UAlberta.Ca.
"Faculty", Mannes College The New School for Music.
"Henry Klumpenhouwer", Academia.edu.

Living people
Canadian musicologists
Year of birth missing (living people)